is a Japanese kickboxer, better known by his ring name Tsubasa. He currently competes in the super flyweight division of RISE. Between November 2022 and January 2023, he was ranked as the fourth best flyweight kickboxer in the world by Beyond Kick.

Professional kickboxing career

SNKA & JKA
Tsubasa made his professional debut against Yuma Sano at JKA "KICK Insist 6" on November 6, 2016. He won the fight by unanimous decision. Next year, at SNKA "WINNERS 2017 2nd" on May 14, Tsubasa would fight to a career first decision draw against Kyohei Furumura.

Tsubasa faced Tetsu Ittokan at KICK Insist 8 on November 11, 2018. He won the fight by a second-round technical knockout. Tsubasa won all four of his fights in 2019 as well, as he knocked out Kazuya Kato on January 6, and Ryohei Tanaka on May 12, and was able to overcome both Ryuji Ebihara on August 4, and Ryohei Tanaka in a vacant JKA Bantamweight title bout on November 9, by unanimous decision.

Tsubasa was expected to face Ikko Ota at KICK Insist 10 on March 15, 2020, in a "JKA vs. NJKF" themed bout. The entire event was later postponed until November 22, due to measures implemented to combat the COVID-19 pandemic. Tsubasa lost the fight by unanimous decision.

Tsubasa faced the WMC Japan Super Bantamweight champion Yugo Kato in a non-title bout at NO KICK NO LIFE on July 22, 2021. He lost the fight by unanimous decision.

RISE
Tsubasa made his RISE promotional debut against the WMC Intercontinetal bantamweight champion Atsumu at RISE 155 on February 23, 2022. He won the fight by a second-round technical knockout. Tsubasa next faced Kyosuke at RISE 156 on March 27, 2022. Kyosuke won the fight by a second-round technical knockout, handing Tsubasa the first stoppage loss of his professional career.

Tsubasa faced the #2 ranked RISE super flyweight contender Ryu Hanaoka at RISE World Series 2022 on October 15, 2022. He won the fight by an upset technical decision. The bout was stopped four seconds before the end of the second round, due to an accidental clash of heads which left a cut above Tsubasa's right eye.

Tsubasa faced Shuto Sato at RISE WORLD SERIES / SHOOTBOXING-KINGS, an event co-promoted by RISE with Glory and Shootboxing, on December 25, 2022. He lost the fight by a first-round technical knockout.

Championships and accomplishments
Japan Kickboxing Association
 2019 JKA Bantamweight Championship

Kickboxing record

|-
|-  style="background:#fbb;"
| 2022-12-25|| Loss ||align=left| Shuto Sato || RISE WORLD SERIES / SHOOTBOXING-KINGS|| Tokyo, Japan || TKO (3 knockdowns)  || 1 ||
|-
|-  style="text-align:center; background:#cfc"
| 2022-10-15 || Win ||align=left| Ryu Hanaoka || Rise World Series 2022 || Tokyo, Japan || Tech. Decision (Unanimous) || 2 || 2:56
|-
|-  style="text-align:center; background:#cfc"
| 2022-07-29 || Win ||align=left| Soma Tameda || RISE 160 || Tokyo, Japan || TKO (Punches) || 1 || 0:31
|-
|-  style="text-align:center; background:#fbb"
| 2022-03-27 || Loss ||align=left| Kyosuke || RISE 156 || Tokyo, Japan || TKO (Punches) || 2 || 0:30
|-
|-  style="text-align:center; background:#cfc"
| 2022-02-23 || Win ||align=left| Atsumu || RISE 155 || Tokyo, Japan || TKO (Punches) || 2 || 1:11
|-
|-  style="text-align:center; background:#fbb"
| 2021-07-22 || Loss ||align=left| Yugo Kato || NO KICK NO LIFE || Tokyo, Japan || Decision (Unanimous) || 3 || 3:00
|-
|-  style="text-align:center; background:#fbb"
| 2020-11-22 || Loss ||align=left| Ikko Ota || JKA "Kick Insist 10" || Tokyo, Japan || Decision (Unanimous) || 3 || 3:00
|-
|-  style="text-align:center; background:#cfc"
| 2019-11-09|| Win ||align=left| Ryohei Tanaka || JKA "Kick Insist 9" || Tokyo, Japan || Decision (Unanimous) || 5 || 3:00
|-
! style=background:white colspan=9 |

|-  style="text-align:center; background:#cfc"
| 2019-08-04 || Win ||align=left| Ryuji Ebihara || JKA "KICK ORIGIN" || Tokyo, Japan || Decision (Unanimous) || 3 || 3:00
|-
|-  style="text-align:center; background:#cfc"
| 2019-05-12 || Win ||align=left| Ryohei Tanaka || JKA "KICK ORIGIN" || Tokyo, Japan || KO (Left straight) || 2 || 1:07

|-  style="text-align:center; background:#cfc"
| 2019-01-06 || Win ||align=left| Kazuya Kato || SNKA "WINNERS 2019 1st" || Tokyo, Japan || TKO || 1 || 2:52

|-  style="text-align:center; background:#cfc"
| 2018-11-11 || Win ||align=left| Tetsu Ittokan || JKA "KICK Insist 8" || Tokyo, Japan || KO (Body shot) || 2 || 0:20

|-  style="text-align:center; background:#cfc"
| 2018-08-04 || Win ||align=left| Hideyoshi Yamano|| SNKA "WINNERS 2018 3rd" || Tokyo, Japan || TKO || 1 || 1:15

|-  style="text-align:center; background:#c5d2ea"
| 2017-05-14 || Draw||align=left| Kyohei Furumura|| SNKA "WINNERS 2017 2nd" || Tokyo, Japan || Decision || 2 || 3:00

|-  style="text-align:center; background:#cfc"
| 2016-11-06 || Win ||align=left| Yuma Sano || JKA "KICK Insist 6" || Tokyo, Japan || Decision (Unanimous) || 2 || 3:00
|-
| colspan=9 | Legend:    

|-  style="background:#cfc;"
| 2016-03-13 || Win ||align=left| Koki Osaki || MuayThai Super Fight Suk Wan Kingthong vol.4 || Tokyo, Japan || Decision  || 2 || 2:00

|-  style="background:#fbb;"
| 2015-12-20 || Loss ||align=left| Tatsuya Takagi || MuayThai Super Fight Suk Wan Kingthong vol.3 || Tokyo, Japan || Decision  || 2 || 2:00

|-  style="background:#cfc;"
| 2015-08-02 || Win ||align=left| Shota Tawaraya || MuayThai Super Fight Suk Wan Kingthong  || Tokyo, Japan || Decision  || 2 || 2:00

|-  style="background:#cfc;"
| 2015-06-21 || Win ||align=left| Yugo Kato ||   || Tokyo, Japan || Decision  || 2 || 2:00

|-  style="background:#cfc;"
| 2015-04-26 || Win||align=left| Masami Watanabe || MuayThai Super Fight Suk Wan Kingthong || Tokyo, Japan || KO || 1 || 

|-  style="background:#cfc;"
| 2014-11-16 || Win||align=left| Ryuichi Sunagawa ||  || Tokyo, Japan || KO || 1 || 
|-
| colspan=9 | Legend:

See also
 List of male kickboxers

References

1996 births
Living people
Japanese male kickboxers
Sportspeople from Saitama Prefecture